Doris of Epizephyrian Locris was the daughter of Xenetus, wife of the Sicilian tyrant Dionysius I of Syracuse, and mother of Dionysius II of Syracuse.

She died before her husband, who seems to have lamented her in one of his tragedies.

Notes

Locrians
4th-century BC Greek people